The Queens Community Board 4 is a local government in the New York City borough of Queens, encompassing the neighborhoods of Elmhurst, Corona, Corona Heights, Newtown, and also includes LeFrak City,  Queens Center Mall and Flushing Meadows-Corona Park. It is delimited by Roosevelt Avenue to the north, the New York Connecting Railroad to the west, the Horace Harding Expressway to the south and Flushing Meadows Corona Park on the east.

References

External links
Profile of the Community Board

Community boards of Queens